Something Creeping in The Dark is a 1971 Italian horror film directed by  and starring Farley Granger and Lucia Bosè.

Plot 
After being stranded on a flooded road a group of people, including a homicidal killer and his two arresting police officers, take refuge in a deserted mansion which was once owned by a witch. There they find the sole inhabitant is the former caretaker and decide to hold a seance, which conjures up supernatural forces.

Cast 
Farley Granger as Spike
Lucia Bosè as Sylvia Forrest
Giacomo Rossi Stuart as Donald Forres
Stelvio Rosi as Dr. Williams (as Stan Cooper)
Mia Genberg as Susan West
Gianni Medici as Joe  
Giulia Rovai as Joe's Girl 
Angelo Francesco Lavagnino as Prof. Lawrence 
Dino Fazio 	 as Insp. Wright
Loredana Nusciak as Photo Model

Production
The original script for Something Creeping in the Dark was written by director Mario Colucci in 1961 as La notte dei dannati, originally intended to be an Italian and German co-production directed by Primo Zeglio. Production was intended to begin in 1962, which never started. The film was shot between May and July 1970 at Incir-De Paolis studios in Rome.

Release
Something Creeping in the Dark was distributed theatrically by D.D.F. in Italy on 15 April 1971. The film grossed a total of 110,905,000 Italian lire domestically. The film has also been released as Creeping in the Night as a promotional title in Ireland and Shadows in the Dark.

Something Creeping in the Dark was the final film of Colucci's to be released theatrically. Colucci began work on a giallo film in 1972 which would only be released in 2012.

See also
 List of Italian films of 1971

References

Footnotes

Sources

External links

Something Creeping in The Dark at Variety Distribution

1971 horror films
1971 films
Italian horror films
Films shot in Rome
Films scored by Angelo Francesco Lavagnino
1970s Italian films